Lilith George Norman (1927–2017) was an Australian children's writer, also known for her editorship of the New South Wales School Magazine.

Early life and education 
Norman was born in Sydney, New South Wales on 27 November 1927. Part of her childhood was spent in Goulburn, where she attended Bourke Street Primary School, came second in Class 6A and secured admission to Goulburn High School. Instead she moved to Waverley and was educated at Sydney Girls High School from 1940 to 1944. She won a short story prize in 1943.

Career 
Norman found work as an assistant at Newtown Library from 1947 to 1948 and worked as a telephonist at a London hotel 1950–1951. Returning to Sydney she became a sales assistant at Angus & Robertson in 1952–1953. She then nursed at Balmain Hospital for three years before returning to librarianship, being promoted to children's librarian at the Sydney Public Library in 1966.

In 1970 Norman joined the New South Wales School Magazine as assistant editor. She was promoted to editor in 1975 on the resignation of Patricia Wrightson. After three years as editor she resigned in December 1978 to write full time.

Her works for children were noted for their realistic depictions of families facing difficult circumstances. A Dream of Seas, for example, deals with a young boy coping with his father's death and has "elements of magic realism".

Selected works

Children's fiction

Nonfiction

Awards and recognition 

 Sydney Morning Herald Literary Competition – Poetry, joint third prize, 1947
 Children's Book of the Year Award: Older Readers, commended for Climb a Lonely Hill, 1971
 IBBY Australia Honour for Writing, winner for A Dream of Seas, 1980
 Australian Family Therapists' Award for Children's Literature – Picture Book and Younger Readers, winner for Granpa, 1999
 Children's Book of the Year Award: Picture Book, honour book for Granpa, 1999

References

External links 

 Lilith Norman at her home, Sydney, 1995, photograph by Reece Scannell
 

1927 births
2017 deaths
Australian children's writers
People educated at Sydney Girls High School